Staré Hory is a village in the Banská Bystrica Region in Central Slovakia. It is situated in the Staré Hory Mountains, between the Veľká Fatra and Low Tatra mountain ranges. As of the end of 2019, the village had a population of 555.

The copper deposits in the vicinity of the village were exploited as early as 2000–1700 BC. The stone tools used by prehistoric miners have been found both in Staré Hory and the nearby village of Špania Dolina. However, the name of the village was mentioned for the first time in 1536. In the 16th century, a smelting plant was built there. After the mining industry declined, the main economic activity shifted from the production of copper and charcoal to making bobbin lace. Merchants from Staré Hory were selling bobbin lace all over Austria-Hungary.

A natural spring with a statue of Virgin Mary near Staré Hory is a traditional place of pilgrimage. There is also a Baroque church, originally built in the 15th century, situated in the village. This church dons the status of a minor basilica as classified by the Roman Catholic Church, the Basilica of the Visitation.

References

External links
Municipality of Staré Hory

Villages and municipalities in Banská Bystrica District